Crucorney  is a community in the county of Monmouthshire, Wales. It is the northernmost community in the county and covers the villages of Llanvihangel Crucorney, Pandy, Cwmyoy and Llanthony amongst others. The Vale of Ewyas comprises much of the northern part of the community, with the River Honddu running through Llanthony and Llanvihangel Crucorney, before turning northeast passing Pandy towards the River Monnow. The 2011 population was 1,201.

Notable landmarks include Llanthony Priory, a Grade I listed former Augustinian priory at Llanthony. Offa's Dyke Path runs along the border between Crucorney and the English county of Herefordshire. The community also has a voluntary group, The Crucorney Environmental Group, which oversees environmental and sustainability issues, including sustainable development, recycling and litter picking.

Governance
The community elects a community council of eleven councillors. The council meets monthly on the third Tuesday of each month.

Crucorney is also the name of the electoral ward for Monmouthshire County Council. The ward also covers the neighbouring Grosmont community and elects one county councillor.

References

External links
 Crucorney Community Portal

Communities in Monmouthshire
Monmouthshire electoral wards